Rebecca Lissner is an American political scientist and foreign policy expert who currently serves as Deputy National Security Adviser to Vice President Kamala Harris. Previously, she was Acting Senior Director for Strategic Planning on the National Security Council, where she oversaw the creation of the Biden Administration’s National Security Strategy and directed the Russia Strategy Group. During the Obama Administration, Lissner served as Special Advisor to Deputy Secretary of Energy, Elizabeth Sherwood-Randall.

Lissner holds an A.B., magna cum laude with highest honors in social studies, from Harvard University and went on to study at Georgetown University, receiving a master's degree and a doctorate in Government.

Lissner was previously on the faculty of the Center for Naval Warfare Studies at the Naval War College. Prior to that, she held a number of research fellowships and teaching positions, including at Yale University, the University of Pennsylvania, and the Council on Foreign Relations.

Her husband, Samuel Lissner, is a principal at Ridgewood Infrastructure, a private equity firm specializing in water, energy transition, utilities, and transportation infrastructure investments. He is also a managing partner at Ridgewood Energy, a private equity firm focused on oil and gas investments in the U.S. deepwater Gulf of Mexico.

Publications 
Lissner has published articles in Foreign Affairs, The Washington Post, Foreign Policy, and The Atlantic.

She has also authored two books:

 Wars of Revelation: The Transformative Effects of Military Intervention on Grand Strategy (Oxford University Press, January 2022).
 An Open World: How America Can Win the Contest for 21st Century Order, with Mira Rapp-Hooper (Yale University Press, September 2020).

References 

United States National Security Council staffers
21st-century American diplomats
Kamala Harris
Biden administration personnel

Year of birth missing (living people)
Living people
Harvard College alumni
Georgetown University alumni
American political scientists
21st-century American women writers
Women political scientists